Abdulkhaleq Sabeeh Maeedi (born 4 January 1991) is an Iraqi kickboxer. He was the 2017 Asian Indoor and Martial Arts Games champion, the 2019 world champion and the champion of Iraq since 2010. His weight is 51 kg.

Titles and accomplishments 

 2011 World Kickboxing Championships in Russia ( 51 kg) Gold medalist
 2012 Russia Kickboxing Championship ( 51 kg) Gold medalist
 2013 World Kickboxing Championships in Russia ( 51 kg) Silver medalist
 2014 Arab Martial Arts Championship in Morocco ( 51 kg) Gold medalist
 2015 Kickboxing Professional Championship in Kazakhstan ( 51 kg) Gold medalist
 2016 Arab Martial Arts Championship in Jordan( 51 kg) Gold medalist
 2017 Kickboxing at the 2017 Asian Indoor and Martial Arts Games( 51 kg) Gold medalist
 2017 Asian Indoor and Martial Arts Games( 51 kg) Silver medalist
 2019 World Kickboxing Championships in Russia( 51 kg) Gold medalist

References 

1991 births
Living people
Iraqi male kickboxers
Basra Governorate